Lan O'Kun (January 13, 1932 – January 9, 2020) was an American screenwriter, playwright, lyricist and composer. He was a television writer for That Was the Week That Was, Apple's Way, The Love Boat, Star Trek: The Next Generation, Highway to Heaven, and The Twilight Zone. He worked as a composer for Barbra Streisand and had a long collaboration with his sister-in-law, and entertainer, Shari Lewis, which brought to life her puppets Lamb Chop, Charlie Horse, and Hush Puppy.

References

1932 births
2020 deaths
Writers from New York City
People from Malibu, California
Syracuse University alumni
Screenwriters from New York (state)
American television writers
American male composers
20th-century American composers
21st-century American composers
American lyricists
20th-century American male musicians
21st-century American male musicians
20th-century American male writers
Musicians from New York City
Screenwriters from California
Musicians from California